The name Lucy has been used for seven tropical cyclones worldwide, six in the Western Pacific Ocean and one in the South-West Indian Ocean.

In Western Pacific:
 Typhoon Lucy (1962) – a typhoon that struck Vietnam, killing five people.
 Typhoon Lucy (1965) – a powerful typhoon that later struck Japan after it weakened.
 Typhoon Lucy (1968) – a typhoon east of the Philippines.
 Typhoon Lucy (1971) – a typhoon that brushed the Philippines and later struck China.
 Tropical Storm Lucy (1974) – a tropical storm that struck southern China.
 Typhoon Lucy (1977) – a typhoon east of the Philippines.

In South-West Indian Ocean:
 Tropical Storm Lucy (1962) – a short-lived tropical storm in the south-west Indian Ocean.

Pacific typhoon set index articles
South-West Indian Ocean cyclone set index articles